The 2021–22 Syed Mushtaq Ali Trophy was the fourteenth season of the Syed Mushtaq Ali Trophy, a Twenty20 cricket tournament played in India. It was contested by 38 teams, divided into six groups, with six teams in Group B. The tournament was announced by BCCI on 3 July 2021.

Bengal and Karnataka both won four matches, with Bengal topping the group on net run rate. Therefore, Bengal advanced to the quarter-finals and Karnataka progressed to the preliminary quarter-finals.

Points table

Fixtures
Source:

Round 1

Round 2

Round 3

Round 4

Round 5

References

2021 in Indian cricket
Domestic cricket competitions in 2021–22